Jreijes  is a Syrian village located in Jubb Ramlah Subdistrict in Masyaf District, Hama.  According to the Syria Central Bureau of Statistics (CBS), Jreijes had a population of 1567 in the 2004 census.

References 

Populated places in Masyaf District